Damjan Dostanić (born 3 December 2001) is a Serbian professional footballer who plays as forward for BATE Borisov. He also holds Dutch citizenship.

References 

2001 births
Living people
Footballers from Rotterdam
Association football forwards
Serbian footballers
Serbia youth international footballers
Excelsior Rotterdam players
AFC Ajax players
Jong Ajax players
FK TSC Bačka Topola players
OFK Žarkovo players
FC BATE Borisov players
Serbian SuperLiga players
Eerste Divisie players
Serbian First League players
Serbian expatriate footballers
Expatriate footballers in the Netherlands
Expatriate footballers in Belarus